John Peter Olszewski (December 21, 1929 – December 8, 1996) was an American football fullback. He was drafted in the first round (fourth overall) of the 1953 NFL Draft and played professionally for the Chicago Cardinals, Washington Redskins and Detroit Lions. Olszewski was selected to play in the Pro Bowl after the 1953 and 1955 seasons. Known as Johnny O, he was among the first NFL players to wear the jersey number zero. He concluded his career in the American Football League (AFL) with the Denver Broncos in 1962.  

Olszewski was an All-America at the University of California, Berkeley, where he starred in the backfield for three seasons. Through the 2020 season, he still was the No. 10 ground-gainer (2,504 yards) in school history. He was inducted into the California Athletics Hall of Fame in 1993.

See also

 List of American Football League players

References

External links
 

1930 births
1996 deaths
American football fullbacks
California Golden Bears football players
Chicago Cardinals players
Detroit Lions players
Denver Broncos (AFL) players
Washington Redskins players
Eastern Conference Pro Bowl players
Players of American football from Long Beach, California
Players of American football from Washington, D.C.